The R405 is a Regional Route in South Africa. Its southern terminus is the N2 at Mount Frere in the Eastern Cape. It runs north-west to meet the R56 midway between Mount Fletcher and Matatiele.

References

Regional Routes in the Eastern Cape